John  Harvey  (died 1679) was the governor of Albemarle Sound, in The Carolinas, in 1679.

Early life 
Harvey was born between 1628 and 1630, in Warwickshire, England, to Thomas and Mary Harvey. His family settled in Virginia around 1640. He emigrated to Albemarle County (modern Perquimans County), North Carolina, in 1659.

Career 

John Harvey probably bought the peninsula known as Harvey's Neck, NC, in the Albemarle Sound. Many historians believe him to be the first settler of Albemarle. Harvey was one of the leaders of the region's anti-property faction. He was respected by the population of the colony, even among his political rivals. He started his political career serving in the Samuel Stephen’s council and the Governments of Peter Carteret and John Jenkins, services he exercised until 1676.

During Culpeper's Rebellion, Harvey captured Marshal General (High Sheriff) of Albemarle Edward Wade, when the rebellion started.

In February 1679 he was appointed chairman and acting governor, after the news came that the former governor, Seth Sothel, had been captured by pirates. His administration as governor ended with his premature death in January 1680, in Albemarle County.

Personal life 
Harvey married Dorothy Tooke, in Isle Of Wight County, Virginia. Their three children were Robert, Richard and Thomas Harvey (future deputy governor of North Carolina).

References 

American colonial governors
American colonial people
1679 deaths